The Cishan Bus Station is a bus station in Cishan District, Kaohsiung, Taiwan. This station is often referred as "the South Station" by local residents. The building was originally the Cishan South Bus Station of Kaohsiung Transportation Co., Ltd. and underwent modification with solar cells installed on the roof and reconfiguration of the interior. The modification was completed in 2013. Monitors were set to display coming buses. There were 7 doors for boarding/unboarding buses.
Inside the building there are several shops, including a convenient store facing Datong Street. 
Customer services, such as lost items, is provided here. 
 
The Cishan North Bus Station() is located at No.197, Yanping 1st Road, Cishan District, Kaohsiung City. It operates as a terminal station for some routes of Kaohsiung Transportation Co., Ltd..

Facilities

Cishan Bus Station
 Toilet
 Convenient Store
 Kaohsiung Transportation Co. Ltd. local office
Passengers without valid smartcards have to buy tickets from the driver while boarding the bus. However, monthly tickets of some routes passing Cishan is available at the office of Kaohsiung Transportation Company in the station. The staff here also helps manage smartcard problems.

Cishan North Station
 Garage and yard of Kaohsiung Transportation Co. Ltd.

Bus routes

Cishan Bus Station (the South station)
  Kaohsiung Transportation
 E01: Zuoying HSR Station-Cishan-Meinong
 E07: Shih Chien University-Cishan North Bus Station-Tainan HSR Station
 E25: Kaohsiung-Meinong-Liouguei Bus Station
 E28: Kaohsiung-Cishan-Meinong
 E32: Kaohsiung-Jiaxian
 8009: Kaohsiung-Chengcing Lake-Cishan
 8010: Kaohsiung-Fo Guang Shan—Cishan
 8010 (local): Fengshan Bus Station-Cishan North Bus Station
 8012: Cishan-Gangshan Tou—Gangshan
 8023: Kaohsiung-Nanzih—Cishan
 8023 (local): Nanzih-Cishan
 8026: Cishan-Daai Village (Shanlin District)-Muzi
 8035: Cishan-Nanhua
 8035 (local): Cishan-Neimen
 8036: Cishan-Zhufeng Temple
 8037: Cishan North Bus Station-Ligang
 8050: Tainan Station-Fo Guang Shan Buddha Museum
 H11: Taoyuan District Office (Kaohsiung)-Kaohsiung Chang Gung Memorial Hospital (on Mondays, Wednesdays, and Fridays)
 H11A: Baolai-Kaohsiung Chang Gung Memorial Hospital (on Mondays, Wednesdays, and Fridays)
 H12: Taoyuan District Office (Kaohsiung)-Kaohsiung Medical University Hospital (on Tuesdays and Thursdays)
 H21: Namasia District Office-Kaohsiung Medical University Hospital (on Mondays, Wednesdays, and Fridays)
 H21 (local): Jiaxian-Cishan (on Mondays, Wednesdays, and Fridays)
 H22: Namasia District Office-Kaohsiung Chang Gung Memorial Hospital (on Tuesdays and Thursdays)
 H31: Cishan-Duona (Maolin District) (on Weekdays)
 EDA Bus
 261: EDA Hospital-Cishan

Cishan North Bus Station
  Kaohsiung Transportation
 E32: Kaohsiung-Jiaxian
 8023: Kaohsiung-Nanzih—Cishan
 8023 (local): Nanzih-Cishan
 8026: Cishan-Daai Village (Shanlin District)-Muzi
 8035: Cishan-Nanhua
 8035 (local): Cishan-Neimen
 8036: Cishan-Zhufeng Temple
 8037: Cishan North Bus Station-Ligang
 8050: Tainan Station-Fo Guang Shan Buddha Museum

Nearby Tourist Attractions
 Jhongshan Old Street
 Qishan Station
 Qishan Tianhou Temple
 Cishan Wude Hall
 Jhongshan Park
 Stone Arches Corridor

See also
 Kaohsiung Main Station
 Zuoying HSR Station

References

External links

official website

2013 establishments in Taiwan
Buildings and structures in Kaohsiung
Bus stations in Taiwan
Transportation in Kaohsiung
Transport infrastructure completed in 2013